Cefn Hirgoed is a ridge in Bridgend county borough in South Wales. 
The ridge extends for about 5 km east from the village of Sarn just north of Bridgend to Pen-prysg north of Pencoed. At the point where it reaches its highest elevation of 142m, are a couple of covered reservoirs. Towards the west the M4 motorway runs along the hill’s southern edge.

Geology 
The hill is formed from relatively hard-wearing sandstones of the South Wales Lower Coal Measures with mudstone layers between the sandstones which here dip steeply northwards into the South Wales Coalfield syncline.

Access 
Almost the entire hill is mapped as open country under the Countryside and Rights of Way Act 2000 giving a general right of access on foot to the public. It and the adjacent Hirwaun Common are also crossed by several public footpaths. A couple of minor roads, Heol Spencer and Heol Llan/Heol-Las, run north-south across the ridge.

References

External links 
 images of Cefn Hirgoed and area on Geograph website

Mountains and hills of Bridgend County Borough